Michael Franklin Quitugua San Nicolas (born January 30, 1981) is a Guamanian Democratic Party politician, who served as the delegate to the U.S. House of Representatives for  from 2019 to 2023. San Nicolas was elected by his colleagues in the 116th United States Congress to serve as vice chair of the United States House Committee on Financial Services. Rather than run for reelection in 2022, San Nicholas ran and lost in the Democratic primary of the 2022 Guamanian gubernatorial election. From 2013 to 2019, San Nicolas served as senator in the 32nd, 33rd, and 34th Guam legislatures.

Early life 
San Nicolas, born January 30, 1981, in Hemlanis Harmon. He is the eldest son of Miguel Borja San Nicolas and Eva Quitugua San Nicolas of Talofofo, Guam, both long-time educators at the Guam Department of Education. His paternal grandfather Enrique Santos San Nicolas served in the Guam Congress and his maternal grandfather is former Speaker of the Guam Legislature Franklin Joseph Arceo Quitugua. He is the great grandson of Ignacio Perez Quitugua, who served in the 1st to 9th Guam Legislatures.

San Nicolas attended Father Dueñas Memorial School, John F. Kennedy High School, and Southern High School, graduating from the latter. San Nicolas met his future wife, Kathryn Santos Ko, while attending John F. Kennedy High School. They married in 2005, and together have two children.

In November 1998, President Bill Clinton visited Guam and delivered a speech to a large rally gathered at Adelup. As a youth speaker, San Nicolas introduced President Clinton to the attendees.

San Nicolas studied history at the University of Guam. While attending the university, he served as Speaker of the 22nd Guam Youth Congress from 1998 to 2000 and elected by his peers as President of the Student Government Association in 2002–2003. He received a Bachelor of Arts degree from the University of Guam in 2004.

Prior to running for the legislature in 2012, San Nicolas had worked as Chief of Staff for Senator Carmen Fernandez in the 27th Guam Legislature and subsequently as Assistant Vice President and Financial Adviser at the Bank of Guam.

Guam legislature

Elections 
San Nicolas ran for senator in the Guam Legislature as a Democrat in 2012. He placed 8th in the primary election with 6,570 votes and advanced to the general election, where he placed 5th with 16,625 votes, winning a seat in the incoming 32nd Guam Legislature. San Nicolas served three consecutive terms in the Guam Legislature before becoming Guam's At-Large Congressional Delegate in 2019.

Committee leadership 
San Nicolas served as Chairman of a number of committees during his tenure in the Guam Legislature, including the Aviation, Ground Transportation, Regulatory Concerns and Future Generations in the 32nd Guam Legislature, the Committee on Finance & Taxation, General Government Operations, and Youth Development in the 33rd Guam Legislature, the Committee on Rules in the first year of the 34th Guam Legislature, and the Committee on General Government Operations and Federal, Foreign, & Regional Affairs in the 34th Guam Legislature.

Actions taken in the Guam legislature

Repealing pay increases for elected and appointed officials 
After the 2014 general election acting Governor Ray Tenorio introduced a bill to increase salaries of elected and appointed officials retroactively. The bill was passed by the legislature in San Nicolas' absence. In December, San Nicolas introduced a bill to repeal the raises, which failed passage. Starting later that month, San Nicolas began to donate the pay increase to local charities.

San Nicolas introduced a bill in 2015 to repeal the elected and appointed officials' pay raises, among other related matters.  The bill was enacted, but the provision repealing the pay raises was removed before passage. San Nicolas revisited repealing the pay raises for elected and appointed officials by introducing a new bill later in the year, but it failed passage in November. The Guam Legislature reconsidered and passed the new bill in January 2016. Governor Calvo vetoed the new bill. An attempted override of the new bill failed.

Senator San Nicolas introduced a bill in 2017, which would reduce the salaries of elected and appointed officials that had been raised by Public Law 32-208. A similar measure, which affected only the salaries  of the attorney general, the public auditor, the governor, the lieutenant governor, and members of the Guam Legislature was introduced days prior was passed by the legislature in March, vetoed by Governor Calvo, then was overridden by the legislature in May.

Federal affairs 
In May 2014, San Nicolas introduced a resolution to request that Congresswoman Madeleine Z. Bordallo introduce legislation to the United States Congress to allow government of Guam employees to be covered under Social Security.  In June, the resolution passed with the unanimous support of the Guam Legislature. In April 2015, Senator San Nicolas met with professionals in the Social Security Administration and the Staff Director of Rep. Xavier Becerra (D-CA) Ranking Member of the Subcommittee on Social Security to secure a path to providing Social Security benefits to government of Guam workers.

Senator San Nicolas introduced Resolutions No. 63-34 (COR), 64-34 (COR), and 65-34 (COR) in 2017, which each seek to improve Section 30 tax collections, which were adopted.

In 2017, San Nicolas introduced Resolution No. 215-34 (COR), which requests the Federal Trade Commission to review the trade practices and market concentration in Guam's fuel market, which passed unanimously.

Other initiatives 
In March 2014, San Nicolas introduced a bill to allow foster children to be included in the government of Guam's group health insurance, expanding their treatment options. On October 3, the bill was passed by the Guam Legislature.

Delegate to the U.S. House of Representatives

Elections
In November 2017, San Nicolas announced his intention to become the 2018 general election candidate of the Democratic Party of Guam to serve as the Guam Delegate to the U.S. House of Representatives in the 116th U.S. Congress. He defeated eight-term incumbent Guam Congressional Delegate Madeleine Z. Bordallo in the Democratic primary election in August by 3.4% of the vote, advancing to the general election in November. He defeated Republican Party candidate Doris Flores Books in the General Election in November.

In 2020, San Nicolas was re-elected. Due to the COVID-19 pandemic, Guam cancelled party primaries and all qualified candidates appeared on the November 3 general election ballot. San Nicolas came in first in a three-way race against former Guamanian delegate to Congress Democrat Robert A. Underwood and Republican territorial senator Wil Castro, but did not win an outright majority. In the November 17 runoff, San Nicolas defeated Underwood earning more than 59% of the vote.

Tenure 
San Nicolas was sworn in as Guam's Congressional Delegate to the 116th U.S. Congress on January 3, 2019. In March 2021, after Rep. Marjorie Taylor Greene suggested that Guam was a foreign country, San Nicolas brought members of the Guam National Guard to Greene's office.

Leadership 
On May 8, 2019, Congresswoman Maxine Waters, Chairwoman of the House Financial Services Committee of the 116th Congress, announced that San Nicolas was elected to serve as Vice Chair of the House Financial Services Committee.

Ethics investigation 
Since October 2019, San Nicolas has been under investigation by the House Ethics Committee. According to the House Ethics Committee, "The Committee is aware of public allegations that Delegate Michael San Nicolas may have engaged in a sexual relationship with an individual on his congressional staff, converted campaign funds to personal use, and/or accepted improper or excessive campaign contributions."

Committee assignments 
San Nicolas has been assigned to the following committees and subcommittees of the U.S. House of Representatives:
 Committee on Financial Services
 Subcommittee on Investor Protection, Entrepreneurship and Capital Markets
 Subcommittee on National Security, International Development and Monetary Policy
 Committee on Natural Resources
 Subcommittee on Indigenous Peoples of the United States
 Subcommittee on Oversight and Investigations

Caucus memberships 
San Nicolas has joined a number of congressional caucuses, including:
 Congressional Asian Pacific American Caucus
 Congressional Hispanic Caucus
 Congressional Caucus on Korea
 Congressional Taiwan Caucus
 Future Forum Caucus
 U.S.-Japan Caucus
 Congressional U.S.-Philippines Friendship Caucus

Political positions

Supplemental Security Income 
During the 2018 election, San Nicolas proposed that the Supplemental Security Income program should be extended to residents of Guam. San Nicolas introduced the Guam Supplemental Security Income Equality Act on January 3, 2019. Thirty-eight members of the Congressional Hispanic Caucus support the bill.

War claims 
The Guam World War II Loyalty Recognition Act was enacted as a provision of the National Defense 
Authorization Act for Fiscal Year 2017. The United States Treasury has advised that without further action by the U.S. Congress, claimants would not be able to be paid. San Nicolas has introduced two bills to allow payments to be made to those who have filed war claims, H.R. 1141 and H.R. 1365. H.R. 1365 was reported out of the House Natural Resources Committee unanimously and was passed with unanimous consent by the U.S. House of Representatives on Wednesday, July 24, 2019.

Cockfighting in US territories 

In December 2018, the Agricultural Improvement Act of 2018 extended a federal ban on animal fighting to U.S. Territories, which had previously been excluded, effective a year following enactment. San Nicolas has cosponsored Puerto Rican Resident Commissioner Jenniffer González's bill to repeal the ban, which would affect cockfighting in Guam.

Agent Orange and other herbicide exposure in Guam 
Agent Orange and other herbicides were used for tactical purposes in Vietnam during the Vietnam War. Herbicides related to Agent Orange with known negative health affects are also documented as having been used on Guam during the same period. In recognition of this fact, San Nicolas introduced H.R. 1713 to provide for presumptive herbicide exposure status for veterans seeking health coverage and compensation who served in Guam around the Vietnam War period.

Reimbursement of Earned Income Tax Credit 
During a meeting of the financial service committee, San Nicolas urged for the U.S. Treasury to reimburse the Government of Guam for payments it has made to individuals claiming the Earned Income Tax Credit (EITC) for the Guam income tax.

Financial services 
During a financial services committee meeting, San Nicolas stated that the territories had been neglected by financial services companies, citing that the website Zillow, which had executives in attendance, does not include Guam in for its offerings for mortgage loans.

San Nicolas asked a number of large financial institutions to explore the possibility of lowering interest rates in rural areas. A number of chief executives of big banks expressed interest in exploring charging lower rates to rural borrowers.

See also 
 List of Asian Americans and Pacific Islands Americans in the United States Congress

References

External links 

Congressman Michael San Nicolas official U.S. House website

1981 births
21st-century American politicians
Candidates in the 2018 United States elections
Chamorro people
Delegates to the United States House of Representatives from Guam
Democratic Party members of the United States House of Representatives from Guam
Guamanian Democrats
Guamanian Roman Catholics
Living people
Members of the Legislature of Guam
University of Guam alumni